Noreika is a Lithuanian language family name. 

The surname may refer to:
Jonas Noreika (1910–1947), Lithuanian army officer, anti-Soviet rebel
Keith Noreika, American lawyer
Maryellen Noreika (born 1966), United States District Judge
Virgilijus Noreika (1935–2018), Lithuanian tenor

 
Lithuanian-language surnames